Eon or Eons may refer to:

Time 
 Aeon, an indefinite long period of time
 Eon (geology), a division of the geologic time scale

Arts and entertainment

Fictional characters
 Eon, in the 2007 film Ben 10: Race Against Time
 Eon, in the 1976 TV special Rudolph's Shiny New Year
 Master Eon, a character in Skylanders: Spyro's Adventure
 Eon, a character in the TV series Eon Kid

Film 
 Eon Films, a Mexican film distributor
 Eon Productions, a British film production company

Games 
 Eon (role-playing game)
 Eon Digital Entertainment, a British computer games publisher
 Eon Products, an American game company

Literature 
 Eon (novel), by Greg Bear, 1985
 Eon (magazine), for players of Eve Online
 Eon, or The Two Pearls of Wisdom, a 2008 novel by Alison Goodman

Music 
 Eon (album), a 1975 album by Richard Beirach, including a track "Eon"
 Eon, a 2008 album by Grafton Primary
 "Eon", a 2012 song by Celldweller from Wish Upon a Blackstar
 Eons, a 2014 album by Mimicking Birds
 "Eons", a song on the album Soundsystem by 311
 EōN, a 2019 music app by Jean-Michel Jarre

People 
 D'Eon, a surname
 Eon (musician) (1954–2009), British musician
 Mr. Eon, American rapper

Given name or nickname 
 Eon (Korean given name)
 Éon de l'Étoile (died 1150), Breton religious leader
 Eon of Axum, 5th-century King of Axum
 Eon Densworth (born 1938), former Australian rules footballer
 Eon Hooper (born 1991), Guyanese cricketer
 Kim Eon (born 1973), Korean poet
 Lee Eon (1981–2008),  South Korean actor and model
 Eon McKai (born 1979),  American director of pornographic films
 Ali Shama, American visual artist

Surname
 Chevalier d'Éon (Charles-Geneviève-Louis-Auguste-André-Timothée d'Éon de Beaumont, 1728–1810), French diplomat who lived as a woman
 Daniel Eon (born 1939), French footballer

Places
 Eon Mountain, in Canada

Transport 
 Edaran Otomobil Nasional, a Malaysian car distributor
 Elliotts of Newbury, a British aircraft manufacturer 
 Elliotts of Newbury Eon, a monoplane built 1947–1950
 Hyundai Eon, an automobile

Other uses
 eOn, a distributed computing project
 E.ON, a European holding company and electric utility
 Enhanced other networks
 EON FM, now 3MMM, an Australian radio station
 Eons.com, a former social networking website
 National Youth Organisation (Greece), active 1936–1941

See also 

 
 Aeon (disambiguation)
 Aion (disambiguation)